The Chief of the Los Angeles Police Department is the head and senior-most officer to serve in the Los Angeles Police Department (LAPD). The incumbent manages the day-to-day operations of the LAPD and is usually held a four star officer. 

The chief of police is appointed by the mayor and reports to the Board of Commissioners.

List of police chiefs

See also

References 

 
Police
Law enforcement workers from California
Los Angeles